Hugh de Lowther V (c. 1390 - c. 1440s) of Lowther, was an English nobleman, knight and administrator. He served alongside Henry V at the Battle of Agincourt during the Hundred years war (1337-1453) He later served as Sheriff of Cumberland in 1440. His ancestor, Hugh de Lowther, was attorney general for Edward I.

Marriage and Issue
He married a lady of the noble Dewentwater family and had a son, also named Hugh, who was born in 1420.

References

Hugh de Lowther V (Battle of Agincourt Knight) 

1390 births
1440s deaths
Year of birth uncertain
Year of death uncertain